Clementina Marcovigi (1863– 1887) was an Italian painter born in Rimini. She mainly painted still lives of flowers in watercolor. She was a resident of Bologna. In 1884 at Turin she exhibited a canvas with flowers; in 1887 at Venice, another canvas.

References

19th-century Italian painters
1863 births
Painters from Bologna
Italian still life painters
Italian women painters
People from Rimini
Year of death missing
19th-century Italian women artists